Marisa Lock , known professionally as Blue MC, is an Australian rapper and electronic music singer.

Lock was born in Brisbane. From 2000-2002 she fronted live hip-hop/funk band Chi-Qi based in her hometown of Brisbane. In 2003 she moved to Melbourne, performing her original repertoire alongside various Melbourne DJs over hip-hop, break-beat and house music where she began to focus on combining rap with electronic music. Throughout this time she wrote and recorded vocals for various Australian producers such as Bionik World, Superfluid and Hermitude. In 2004 she moved to London and worked with MC Xander as a beatbox duo called Streetbox. During that time in London she wrote and featured vocals on two songs for U.K. electronic duo Hexstatic on their studio album When Robots Go Bad (released 2007). She returned to Sydney, Australia, in late 2006 and joined The Potbelleez where she was featured on the singles Junkyard, Trouble, Shake-It and Midnight-Midnight, throughout her involvement on the band's first two studio albums. In 2012 she left the group to pursue solo projects. She moved to Berlin in 2013 and competed in The Voice of Germany in 2014. During this time she worked closely with guitarist/composer/inventor Rainer Hirl aka Robin Sukroso. In late 2017 she met producer Marcus Maichel forming a new creative alliance. The duo are currently working on material for their up-coming project Cyborg Creature.

References

Living people
Musicians from Brisbane
Australian women rappers
Australian electronic musicians
Electronic music singers
The Voice (franchise) contestants
Australian expatriates in Germany
Australian expatriates in England
Year of birth missing (living people)
Australian women in electronic music
21st-century Australian women singers